Dirk Herbert Arnold Kolff (born 11 February 1938) is a Dutch historian and Indologist. Born at Rotterdam in the Netherlands, Kolff earned a doctorate degree from the Leiden University in 1983 with a doctoral thesis on the research subject of armed peasantry in northern India. He is a professor emeritus of modern South Asian history and the former Chair of Indian History at the Leiden University.

He is the co-founder of the European Association of South Asian Studies and the president of the Netherlands–India Friendship Association.

Education and career
Kolff did M.A. in 1967 at the Leiden University. Later that year, he moved to London on scholarship from the British Council. From 1968 to 1970, he performed field research on agrarian history in India's Allahabad and Jhansi. From 1971 to 1991, he taught the history of South Asia as an associate professor at the Kern Institute of Leiden University in the Netherlands while also completing his Ph.D. at the University in 1983. He was at the University of Chicago as a visiting associate professor in 1989. From 1987 to 1993, he served as the co-editor of Itinerario.

Kolff, from 1991 till his retirement in 2003, taught modern history of South Asia at the Leiden University, and from 1992 to 1997, was also the director of Research School of Asian, African, and Amerindian Studies (CNWS) of the university. At the time of his retirement, he was serving as the 'Chair of Indian History' at the university. From 1992 to 1998, he was a board member of the Indo–Dutch Programme for Alternatives in Development (IDPAD) and the J. Gonda Stichting of the Royal Netherlands Academy of Arts and Sciences (KNAW). Since 1992, he is a member of the editorial board of the Gonda Indological Studies series. He is one of the founders of the European Association of South Asian Studies (EASAS), and since 1995, he is the secretary of the EASAS. From 1 September 1999 to 30 June 2000, he was a research fellow at the Netherlands Institute for Advanced Study. He is the president of the Netherlands–India Friendship Association since 2012, and had also served as its president from 1996 to 2004.

Research
Kolff is a historian and Indologist.  noted that the research interests of Kolff included "India's muslim rulers" and "the working and enduring vitality" of the dynamics of Mughal Empire. Heesterman wrote, "focussing attention on India's 'armed peasantry' in its various guises of both sedentary 'ryots' and itinerant warriors, Kolff brings out the flexibility and dynamics of the Mughal world that was known to its European contemporaries as the 'flourishing Indies'." According to Heesterman, his research played a substantial role in the "fundamental change" in the historiographical approach towards the study of India's history during the Mughal era (1526–1857 CE), which has placed the "dynamics of Indian society" during that period at the forefront of research studies. Earlier, the period was seen in "the static terms of 'oriental society,' the perennial 'village community' and unchangeable rigidities of caste and community".

Kolff's research threw light on a "fluid" and "pervasive" military labor market in India's northern region during the later years of Mughal Empire and the initial years of the British Raj as part of which, fighters who were mostly armed peasants, used to be at the disposal of the kings, mutineers, and military contractors in the region. He highlighted that during this time in the conflict-ridden north Indian society, the regional armed peasants had "considerable agency and independence" in the society. He has theorized that before the establishment of the British Raj in India, an enormous military labor market was widespread in the country. According to John F. Richards of the Duke University, his research is of assistance in underscoring "the magnitude of the changes wrought in Indian society by violent British conquest, pacification and disarmament in rural society—especially after the failed 1857 revolt".

Written work
Kolff's Naukar, Rajput and Sepoy: The Ethnohistory of the Military Labour Market in Hindustan, 1450–1850 (1990) was "an ethnohistory in a military setting", not "a military history with a focus of ethnicity", which according to Kolff was "undertaken at the confluence of anthropology, history and Indology". Kolff coined the term "military labour market", and in the book, introduced this concept on a wide scale in context of the northern region of India. According to University of Cambridge's Randolf G. S. Cooper, Kolff clarified the "understanding of the way in which military service had a life cycle or commodity exchange value that was integral to South Asian society and realpolitik". Cooper further stated that Kolff's work is of assistance in breaking the stereotypical image of the Rajputs as "the saffron robed warrior prince on horseback". Cooper, however, suggested that though Kolff attempted to provide a study of the subject matter from 1450 CE to 1850 CE, it was highly constricted to the 16th and 17th centuries "from the standpoint of functional strength".

University of Akron's A. Martin Wainwright noted that, in the book, Kolff shed light on the "historical pervasiveness of caste in Indian society" and the genesis of Indian State. Wainwright further observed that Kolff presented "new insights" into the "formation of state structures" and "character of peasant society" in India's northern region from the mid-15th century till the Indian Rebellion of 1857, and challenged the "long-held assumptions about the nature of military power and peasant society in northern India before British ascendance".

Works

Books authored

Books edited

Selected papers

See also
Harald Tambs-Lyche
Vidya Dhar Mahajan
Ram Pande

References

External links

1938 births
Writers from Rotterdam
Leiden University alumni
Academic staff of Leiden University
21st-century Dutch historians
Dutch Indologists
Dutch military historians
Living people